The Tamsui–Xinyi Line (code R) is a metro line in Taipei operated by Taipei Metro, named after the districts it connects: Tamsui and Xinyi. It includes a total of 28 stations serving Tamsui, Beitou, Shilin, Datong, Zhongshan, Zhongzheng, Daan, and Xinyi districts. At , it is currently the longest line of the Taipei Metro.

The Tamsui section runs mostly along the former Tamsui railway line. There, most of the tracks and stations have been renovated, except in the Zhongzheng district, where a new tunnel was constructed due to a lack of surface right-of-way.

The Red line is a high-capacity metro system.

History 

With the completion of  station, Xinyi Line, and Songshan Line, both services ended, placing the current form of the Tamsui–Xinyi line into effect.

 July 1988: Tamsui Line begins construction.
 24 December 1998: The section from Taipei Main Station to  begins service.
 11 November 1999: The rest of the Xindian Line opened.
 1 November 2002: Ground broken on Xinyi Line construction.
 12 February 2010: Corridor approved by the Executive Yuan for the Xinyi line eastern extension.
 15 July 2010: The last section of shield tunneling is completed, marking the completion of tunnel construction.
 15 October 2013: The line completed its preliminary inspection.
 24 November 2013: The section between Chiang Kai-shek Memorial Hall and Xiangshan opened and began revenue service.

Services 
As of December 2017, the typical off-peak service is:

Stations 
 M - Main line
 B - Branch Line

See also 
 Xinbeitou branch line

Notes

References 

1997 establishments in Taiwan
Railway lines opened in 1997
Taipei Metro
750 V DC railway electrification